Eberhard König (Grünberg 18 June 1871 - Berlin 26 December 1949) was a Silesian German writer and dramatist.

Works
Libretto for the opera Rübezahl und der Sackpfeifer von Neisse by Hans Sommer 1904

References

1871 births
1949 deaths